Jordi Salvador i Duch (born 23 July 1964) is a Catalan teacher, trade unionist and politician from Spain. He also is a member of the Congress of Deputies of Spain.

Early life
Salvador was born on 23 July 1964 in Barcelona, Catalonia. His maternal grandparents were originally from Conca de Barberà but moved to Barcelona in the early part of the 20th century for economic reasons. In 1971, aged six, Salvador and his parents moved to the Torreforta suburb of Tarragona.

Salvador has a bachelor's degree in geography and history and a doctorate in social and cultural anthropology from the Rovira i Virgili University (URV). His 2005 doctoral thesis was titled Futbol Metàfora de una Guerra Freda: Un Estudi Antropològic del Barça. He also has diplomas from the University of Barcelona (UB) to teach social sciences and physics at Educación General Básica (EGB) level.

Career
Salvador was a teacher at various institutions from 1987 to 2015. A member of Federación de Trabajadores de Enseñanza (FETE), he was general-secretary of the Tarragona branch of the Unión General de Trabajadores from 2008 to 2015. He is a member of Òmnium Cultural and Entre Pobles.

Salvador contested the 2015 general election as an independent Republican Left of Catalonia–Catalonia Yes (ERC–CatSí) electoral alliance candidate in the Province of Tarragona and was elected to the Congress of Deputies. He was re-elected at the 2016, April 2019 and November 2019 general elections. In February 2020 he was elected general-secretary of the Tarragona regional branch of the Republican Left of Catalonia.

Electoral history

Notes

References

External links

1964 births
Educators from Catalonia
Trade unionists from Catalonia
Independent politicians in Catalonia
Living people
Members of the 11th Congress of Deputies (Spain)
Members of the 12th Congress of Deputies (Spain)
Members of the 13th Congress of Deputies (Spain)
Members of the 14th Congress of Deputies (Spain)
People from Tarragona
Republican Left of Catalonia politicians
Unión General de Trabajadores members